WSOB may refer to:

 World Series of Backgammon
 World Series of Blackjack
World Series of Bowling